The Bezirk Sankt Johann im Pongau is an administrative district (Bezirk) in the federal state of Salzburg, Austria, and congruent with the Pongau region.

Area of the district is 1,755.37 km², with a population of 77,872 (May 15, 2001), and population density 44 persons per km². Administrative center of the district is Sankt Johann im Pongau.

Administrative divisions
The district is divided into 25 municipalities, three of them are towns, and seven of them are market towns.

Towns
 Bischofshofen (10,087)
 Radstadt (4,710)
 Sankt Johann im Pongau (10,260)

Market towns
 Altenmarkt im Pongau (3,486)
 Bad Hofgastein (6,727)
 Großarl (3,634)
 Sankt Veit im Pongau (3,330)
 Schwarzach im Pongau (3,526)
 Wagrain (3,127)
 Werfen (3,085)

Municipalities
 Bad Gastein (5,838)
 Dorfgastein (1,649)
 Eben im Pongau (2,005)
 Filzmoos (1,352)
 Flachau (2,625)
 Forstau (515)
 Goldegg (2,216)
 Hüttau (1,555)
 Hüttschlag (974)
 Kleinarl (743)
 Mühlbach am Hochkönig (1,629)
 Pfarrwerfen (2,174)
 Sankt Martin am Tennengebirge (1,406)
 Untertauern (453)
 Werfenweng (766)

(population numbers May 15, 2001)

Tourist attractions
 Liechtensteinklamm

See also
 Salzburg
 Salzburgerland

External links

 
Districts of Salzburg (state)